Banar-e Vajel (also Romanized as Banār-e Vājel; also known as Vājel) is a village in Seydun-e Shomali Rural District, Seydun District, Bagh-e Malek County, Khuzestan Province, Iran. At the 2006 census, its population was 815, in 156 families.

References 

Populated places in Bagh-e Malek County